Red and Rio Grande is the first studio album by American country music artist Doug Supernaw. It was released on April 27, 1993 via BNA Records. It produced four singles for Supernaw on the Billboard Hot Country Songs charts, the highest being "I Don't Call Him Daddy" (previously recorded by Kenny Rogers on his album I Prefer the Moonlight) at No. 1.

Critical reception

Michael McCall of Allmusic rated the album four-and-a-half stars out of five, citing "I Don't Call Him Daddy"  as an "anthem" for divorced fathers. Joseph Stanley of Cash Box called it a "solid, well made album", highlighting the first five songs in particular.

Track listing

Personnel
Doug Supernaw: Lead Vocals
Michael Black, Harry Stinson, Doug Supernaw, Mervyn Warren, Chris Willis, Dennis Wilson, Curtis Young: Background Vocals
Larry Byrom, Billy Joe Walker, Jr.: Acoustic Guitar
Steve Gibson, Larry Byrom, Billy Joe Walker Jr.: Electric Guitar
Sonny Garrish: Pedal Steel Guitar
Glen Duncan: Fiddle
Terry McMillan: Harmonica
Mitch Humphries: Piano
Mitch Humphries, Carl Marsh: Keyboards
David Hungate: Bass guitar
Eddie Bayers: Drums

Production
Produced By Richard Landis
Engineered By Chuck Ainlay & Csaba Petocz, with assistance by Todd Culross & Craig White
Mixed By Chuck Ainlay & Graham Lewis
Mastered By Glenn Meadows

Chart performance

Album

Singles

References

1993 debut albums
BNA Records albums
Doug Supernaw albums
Albums produced by Richard Landis